Renné Toney (sometimes Rene) is a female bodybuilder from Brazil.

Training and records
Toney officially has the largest biceps of any woman in the world. In February 2006, her biceps were measured at the Arnold Classic Expo. She achieved her physique after 20 years
Right Biceps: 
Left Biceps:

Contest history
1998 NPC Palm Springs Muscle Classic - 2nd
2002 World Physique Federation Pro Ms. Olympia Cup II - Champion
2004 World Physique Federation Pro Ms. Universe - Champion
2005 NABBA Ms. World - 6th

References

Living people
Brazilian female bodybuilders
American female bodybuilders
Brazilian emigrants to the United States
Year of birth missing (living people)
21st-century American women